Methodist Boys’ High School (MBHS) Oron, Nigeria was established on 18 September 1905 following a proposal by Rev. Nathaniel Boocock a Primitive Methodist Church Minister whose pioneering works in the west coast of Africa also contributed in creating the Missions at Bottler Point, Urua Eye (Udesi) and Adadia. Initially named Oron Training Institute (OTI), the school was established in order to turn the brightest schoolboys into teachers, and in the hope that some of them might eventually become Ministers. Besides the prominence given to evangelism, the institute was also to offer general education which may include instruction in carpentry and other useful trades. The ethos of the school was that of an English public school, character training through religion receiving high priority. Right from the time the school was established; it has undergone several transformations from Teachers Training School to Primary School, High School, Comprehensive High School, and its present status as a Junior & Senior Secondary Schools. Following the return of Mission Schools in Akwa Ibom State to their original owners in 2006, management of MBHS Oron was handed back to the Methodist Mission.

History
In 1870, an English vessel named ‘Elgiva’ on a trading voyage to West Africa from Liverpool, anchored in Santa Isabel harbour, Fernando Po (Bioko). It ferried in it two Primitive Methodist evangelists, William Robinson – the ship's Captain, and James Hands – the carpenter. While there, they got acquainted with the spiritual needs of the inhabitants and felt a strong desire for their evangelization. Before returning to England, a group of Christian converts handed them a letter dated 25 August 1869, requesting that a Minister be sent to them. Following the request, two evangelists, Reverend R. W. Burnett and Henry Roe were selected by the Primitive Methodist Society to embark on a foreign field mission to Africa. On their arrival in that Spanish colony on 21 February 1897, they were warmly welcomed in the house of a fervent convert, Elizabeth ‘Momma’ Job. While there, they built a station and started evangelical work. However, the unfriendly policies of the Spanish authorities which led to the closure of Mission schools there, prompted the Primitive Methodists to turn their search towards a British controlled territory in the Nigerian mainland of West Africa. Hence, in 1893, Archibong Town became the first foreign field to host the Primitive Methodist Mission in Nigeria. A follow up to this was the opening of another station at James Town by Rev. W. J. Ward.
The progress in Archibong Town was subsequently hampered by a ruling of joint boundary commission of both the British and German governments, which ceded Archibong Town into the German territory. This resulted in migration of faithfuls to Ikang and across the river to Afaha Eduok, where the Chiefs and natives were benevolent enough to offer them land to settle. According to Rev. G. E. Wiles, he and Rev. Nathaniel Boocock were traveling to Calabar when they sighted the site and with the eye of faith, Boocock said ‘there I will build my school’. With Archibong Town gradually losing significance, the Oron station was steadily gaining concentration as reflected in Rev. G. H. Hanney's statement...
"Today Archibongville is merely an out-station, almost deserted, but the result of Archibongville is seen in the 400 square miles we occupy on the right bank of the Cross River, and the stations that have been opened further up country, and of which much will be heard in the days that are to come. The Oron Mission has a river frontage of about thirty miles, with an area inland averaging fifteen or sixteen miles in breadth…’’.
With the aid of a Steam Launch from the Marine Department, the Mission House, (a prefabricated structure) was subsequently shipped from Archibong Town to Oron where it was assembled in 1902.

Hence, the first real step towards the development of Western education in Africa by the Primitive Methodist Mission commenced at Oron, where Training Institute for Boys (boarding) was built. This was a direct outcome of the proposal made by Reverend Nathanial Boocock in association with his colleagues. During a meeting of the executive committee of Primitive Methodist Missionary Society (P.M.M.S) in Birmingham, Boocock had proposed:
"That a Training Institute be erected at Oron, where we can receive boarders from our mission schools in Fernando Po
and also the most promising youths from our mission schools in mainland (Nigeria). That, while a general education be
given which may include instruction in carpentry and other useful trades, the pre-eminent aim of the Masters shall be
to train the youths with a view to their becoming Native Teaching Evangelists"

Boocock's proposals contained the size of the building, materials, school fees £5p.a scholarships to the needy but deserving students. The type of Principal required:
"That if possible a properly certified English School Master be appointed – Ministerial or lay – who has a deep passion
 for the spiritual welfare of young people, and who will be prepared to assist in any way he can to extend our Master’s
 Kingdom"

With a resolution adopted after a meeting on 10 May 1904, £1000 was raised by the Christian Endeavour Societies, a popular movement among the Primitive Methodists in England, to defray the cost of the institute. It will be readily seen that the man upon whom the getting of the £1,000 has entailed most cost is the late Secretary, the Rev. George Bennett. And with the arrival of Rev. W. J. Ward in August 1905, the school formerly commenced with two (2) teachers and sixteen (16) students on roll. All but three of the original sixteen students were boarders. Mr. Efa Ekpesuk who was the teacher at Archibong was the Asst Master. The first set of buildings were erected by Rev. R. Banham. There were three main buildings of corrugated iron sheets – a classroom, a dormitory and a third building which comprises a common room and a Day room. The former had been destroyed during the Civil war. On a good part of its foundation stood an all purpose Hall used as classroom block. By the end of the first term, there were eighteen students. All belonged to the Christian Endeavor Society and conducted services each Sunday and sometimes on weekdays in the neighborhood villages.

Early Curriculum and Development
Between 1905 and now, the school have witnessed development in all aspects of life. At commencement, the curriculum comprised elementary school subjects, teaching methods and preaching. At some point, the syllabus was revised to include lessons in printing, bookbinding, carpentry, and elementary sciences. In 1955, the school had on roll 170 boys and 12 teachers. While the school has been an all-boys school from inception, girls were later admitted to be part of the two-year Higher Certificate (Arts) classes (Forms 6 and 7). Higher School Certificate (Science) course was later added in January 1963. By February 1977 according to the school records, enrolment was 888 (718 boarders, 170 day students). Among the boarders there were 17 girls, all belonging to the Higher School Certificate (Arts) Course. Tremendous growth was also witnessed in all spheres of sports activities with the introduction of new games like cricket, quoits, inter-class/inter-school football matches, etc. A report in 1962 had it that, the athletics team consistently gave a good account of themselves in the Provincial A.A.A. and Wilson PARNABY sport meetings. As at 1980 the students population grew to 1099 with 30 teachers. Joint inter-house sports competition and Sunday service with the sister school, Mary Hanney Secondary School had since assumed a regular feature.

School Uniform
One of the distinctive marks of MBHS Oron students is their uniform – Initially, a jacket with a pocket batch and the institute's cap were used. Later years saw alteration in the following uniform combinations which has remained signature colors for the school; white shirt on either of brown khaki shorts/trousers, white shorts/trousers, or maroon shorts/trousers for junior and senior students respectively. These are complemented with a maroon blazer or half jacket (with a pocket batch) especially during ceremonial outings. The later is also adopted by the Alumni as their dress code during official functions. For evening wears, orange shirt on grey coloured shorts/trousers are worn, while white shirt (preferably long sleeves) on white trousers are also used during Sunday Services. In all of these, girls in the Higher School Certificate Classes wore skirts in place of shorts or trousers. Students have also been spotted using maroon tie or bow-ties in some occasions. 
During annual Inter-house sports competition, the different halls of residence (hostels)  are identified by their distinctive uniforms which come in the following colors; Ward House (green), Banham House (white), Groves House (yellow), Boocock House (maroon or orange), Okpo House (royal blue), Wiles House (purple), and Nkposong House (red).

Halls of Residence (Hostels) 
Banham House, Boocock House, Groves House, Nkposong House, Okpo House, Ward House & Wiles House.

School Hymn (The Anchor) 
Will your anchor hold in the storms of life
When the clouds unfold their wings of strife
When the strong tides lift and the cables strain
Will your anchor drift or firm remain
We have an anchor that keeps the soul
Steadfast and sure while the billows roll
Fasten to the Rock which cannot move
Grounded firm and deep in the Saviour's love

Heritage Sites
 House of Shaws (Mission House)
 The Green Castle (Babylon Building)
 MBHS Colonial Jetty by Esuk Mma Beach
 The Academic Well
 Ukpata Stream
 Old and New Chapels
 Mary Hanney's Tombstone
 Love Garden
 The Almond Tree
 The Quadrangle

List of Principals since 1905 

The following Missionaries were in charge for short periods when the Principal was absent on furlough:
Rev. W. Yorcross
Rev. H. B. Hardy
Rev. C. R. Ransome
Rev. H. L. O. Williams
Mr. H. Hodgkinson
Mr. L. R. Shenton

Notable Historical Dates

MBHS Oron Old Boys Association.
The National Executive Council of MBHS Oron Old Boys Association is the third administrative arm of the school. Since 1976, the Old Boys have taken a more active part in the life of the institution. Apart from financial and material support, the alumni association also performs the important role of contributing ideas for the guidance of teachers and students in seeking to maintain the useful and time-tested traditions of the school.
Traditionally, the home branch of the association is situated at Oron, other notable branches include Abuja, Lagos, Port Harcourt, Calabar, Owerri, Warri, and the Diaspora branches. There are also other affiliated alumni groups classified in sets e.g. The PENTASS, The Possibles, The Diamonds, The New Policy Set, The Centenaries, The Crystals, The Prestigious Old Boys, and so on. Popular among the MBHS Alumni community is the phrase ‘Old Boys in Skirt’ which is used to address female old students (from the erstwhile Higher Certificate Classes). 
On 3 November 1979, an alumni fund for Chapel/Assembly Hall was launched and fifty thousand naira (#50,000) was realized on the spot. Friends of the school, former missionaries and parents of students subscribed generously to the fund. The project was finally completed with assistance from Exxon Mobil Nigeria Unlimited and commissioned in the year 2006. Other notable contributions to the school by the alumni include Institution of scholarship to deserving students, awards of excellence, career counseling, lectures, drilling of boreholes, annual Founder's Day celebration, End of year Carol Services, Novelty football matches with sister schools, Renovation of library, classrooms, hostels and other facilities, Donation of books, sport equipments and other instructional materials, etc. 
It is now a tradition to see Old Boys congregate in social events organized by any of its members to render the popular signature ‘Anchor’ hymn of their Alma Mata.

Notable Alumni
 Chief Dr. Clement Nyong Isong. Former Governor of Central Bank, and Governor of Cross River State.
 Prelate Dr. Sunday Mbang. Former President of World Methodist Council and Prelate of Methodist Church Nigeria.
 Dr. Anwana Esin. Former Senator, Federal Minister of Welfare, Internal Affairs and later Local Government.
 Dr. Garrick Barile Leton. Former Federal Minister of Education (1978–1979) and pioneer President of Movement for the Survival of Ogoni People (MOSOP)
 Ambassador Dr. Etim U. Uye. Former Ambassador of Nigeria to Greece.
 Dr. Etim Anwana Amba. Renowned Agronomist and former Permanent Secretary, Cooperation and Integration in Africa, Ministry of Foreign Affairs. 
 Senator Bassey Ewa-Henshaw. Former Senator representing Cross River South.
 Late Prof. Eskor Toyo. Renowned Professor of Political Economy, Labour Activist, Revolutionary and Marxist scholar.
 Dr. Mfon Amana. ICT Expert.
 Senator Nelson Effiong. Senator of the Federal Republic of Nigeria.
 Sir Michael Udofia. Former Deputy Governor of Akwa Ibom State.
 Prof. Dr. Effiong Etukudo Ibok.
 Justice John Inyang Okoro. Justice of the Supreme Court.
 Barrister Ekpo Una Owo Nta. Former Chairman Independent Corrupt Practices and Other Related Offences Commission (ICPC), Full-time Commissioner, National Salaries, Incomes and Wages Commission (NSIWC).
 Group Capt. Edem Oyo-Ita (Rtd). Director Of Air Transport Regulation.
 Etim Esin. Retired International Football Star.

Photo gallery

References

External links 
 List of Secondary Schools in Akwa Ibom
 Full text of "History of the Primitive Methodist Church"
 List of Primary and Secondary Schools in Nigeria

Schools in Akwa Ibom State
Secondary schools in Nigeria
Christian schools in Nigeria
Methodism in Nigeria
Methodist schools
Educational institutions established in 1905
1905 establishments in the British Empire